The 1910-11 French Rugby Union Championship of first division was won by Stade Bordelais  that beat Sporting club universitaire (SCUF) in the final.

Stade Bordelais won all the matches (22) played in the season

That year 
The 1911 Five Nations Championship was won by Wales, France was fourth thanks to his victory against Scotland.

Semifinals

Final

Sources 

 La Vie Sportive, 1911

External links
 Compte rendu de la finale de 1911, sur lnr.fr

1911
Championship
France